Sykes v. United States, 564 U.S. 1 (2011), was a case in which the Supreme Court of the United States held that felony vehicle flight, as proscribed by Indiana law, is a violent felony for purposes of the residual clause of the Armed Career Criminal Act (ACCA). Writing for the majority, Justice Kennedy wrote that vehicle flight requires officers to give chase, resulting in more injuries on average than burglary. Dissenting, Justice Scalia criticized the majority for producing an ad hoc judgment based on vague legislation, suggesting they should declare the residual clause of the law unconstitutionally vague. The court would follow that advice several years later in Johnson v. United States and declare the residual clause unconstitutionally vague.

See also
List of United States Supreme Court cases, volume 564

References

External links
 

2011 in United States case law
United States Supreme Court cases
United States Supreme Court cases of the Roberts Court
Void for vagueness case law
Armed Career Criminal Act case law